Salvatore Mazzarano (born 4 July 1965) is a retired Italian football defender.

References

1965 births
Living people
Italian footballers
A.C. Ancona players
Taranto F.C. 1927 players
Association football defenders
Serie A players
U.S. Castrovillari Calcio players
People from Massafra